Acholibur is a town in Pader District in the Northern Region of Uganda.

Location
The coordinates of Acholibur are 03°08'37.0"N, 32°54'49.0"E (Latitude:3.143611; Longitude:32.913611).

Points of interest
These are some of the points of interest in or near Acholibur:

 offices of the Acholibur Town Council
 headquarters of the Acholibur sub-county
 northern end of the Acholibur–Gulu–Olwiyo Road
 Rwekunye–Apac–Aduku–Lira–Kitgum–Musingo Road, passing through town in a generally north/south direction

See also
 List of cities and towns in Uganda
 List of roads in Uganda

References

External links
 [ ]

Pader District
Populated places in Northern Region, Uganda
Cities in the Great Rift Valley